Moulsford Downs is a  biological Site of Special Scientific Interest north-west of Goring-on-Thames in Oxfordshire.

This chalk grassland site on the Berkshire Downs has a rich wildlife. The diverse invertebrate fauna includes the uncommon robber-fly Leptarthrus brevirostris, the adonis blue butterfly, the juniper shield bug, the weevils Baris picicornis and seed beetle Phyllobius  viridicollis, the leaf beetle Phyllotreta nodicornis and the Bruchus  cisti.

The site is private land with no public access.

References

 
Sites of Special Scientific Interest in Oxfordshire